Edmund "Eddy" Malura (born 24 June 1955) is a former professional German footballer.

Malura made 246 appearances over a decade in the 2. Fußball-Bundesliga during his playing career.

References

External links 
 

1955 births
Living people
German footballers
Association football midfielders
2. Bundesliga players
Tennis Borussia Berlin players
SG Union Solingen players
Rot-Weiß Oberhausen players
German football managers
1. FC Union Solingen managers